Beed Lok Sabha constituency (formerly, Bhir Lok Sabha constituency) is one of the 48 Lok Sabha (parliamentary) constituencies in Maharashtra state in western India. This constituency was formed in 1951, as one of the 25 constituencies of erstwhile Hyderabad State. This Constituency Consist 2056860 (20 Lack 56 thousand and 860 ) Voters In which 1086818 (Lack 86 Thousand 818) Male's, 970037 (9 Lack 70 Thousand 37 ) Female's and 5 other's until 4 October 2019
The current MP, Mrs.Pritam Munde won the seat in the 2019 elections by a victory margin of 168,368 votes. 
[8][a

Assembly segments
At present, Beed Lok Sabha constituency comprises six Vidhan Sabha (legislative assembly) segments as follows:

Members of Parliament

^ By-poll

Election results

General elections 2019

2014 By-election

2014 election

2009 election

See also
 Beed district
 List of Constituencies of the Lok Sabha

Notes

External links
Beed lok sabha  constituency election 2019 results details

Lok Sabha constituencies in Maharashtra
Beed district